Our Latest Catalogue was the debut album of Circus Contraption released in 2001. The album was mainly distributed by CD Baby and has been available in over 40 online stores. Many of the songs from Our Latest Catalogue were played live during band-only shows for audiences willing to pay.

Circus Contraption described the album as "Quirky-jerky, loony-croony, gypsy carnival opera music. Tom Waits meets the Rocky Horror Picture Show? Danny Elfman meets Squirrel Nut Zippers? Listen to this glorious tangle of sounds and decide for yourself."

Track listing

References

2001 albums